The Canadian Jewish Political Affairs Committee (CJPAC) is a national, independent, multi-partisan organization. Its mandate is to engage Jewish and pro-Israel Canadians in the democratic process and to foster active political participation. CJPAC is dedicated to helping community members build relationships within Canadian politics.
 
CJPAC's programs include a Fellowship program, geared toward politically active university students, the Generation program for high school students, the summer camp tour, and campaign training. CJPAC's events include the ACTION parties held in Montreal and Toronto, as well as Women in Politics.
 
CJPAC encourages Canadians to get involved in the democratic process during and between elections.

References

 Tulchinsky, Gerald. Taking Root: The Origins of the Canadian Jewish Community. Toronto, Ont: Lester Pub., 1992. 
 Abella, Irving. A Coat of Many Colours: Two Centuries of Jewish Life in Canada. Toronto: Lester Pub., 1990.

External links
 Canadian Jewish Political Affairs Committee

Jewish organizations based in Ontario
Jewish political organizations
Political advocacy groups in Canada
Zionism in Canada